Events from the year 1739 in Ireland.

Incumbent
Monarch: George II

Events
April 27 – the trial of Henry Barry, 4th Baron Barry of Santry, before the Irish House of Lords for the drunken murder of a tavern servant in Palmerstown the previous summer opens; he is convicted but later pardoned.
July–August – wet summer, affecting the harvest and the cutting of turf.
September 26 – "Address of the Roman Catholics of Ireland" to George II of Great Britain requesting longer leases.
October 6 – the title Earl of Bessborough is created in the Peerage of Ireland in favour of Brabazon Ponsonby, 2nd Viscount Duncannon, chief commissioner of revenue.
December 27–February 1740 – the 'Great Frost': unusually harsh winter.

Births
September 27 – Robert Stewart, 1st Marquess of Londonderry, politician (d. 1821)
October 31 – James Gordon, merchant, soldier, and politician in America (d. 1810)

Full date unknown
Judge Fulton, judge, surveyor, politician, and founder of the village of Bass River, Nova Scotia (d. 1826)
Hugh Kelly, dramatist and poet (d. 1777)
Hugh O'Reilly, Roman Catholic Bishop of Clogher (d. 1801)

Deaths
Charles Jervas, painter, translator and art collector (b. c.1675)

References

 
Years of the 18th century in Ireland
Ireland
1730s in Ireland